Clifford Louis (born August 24, 1984) is a retired gridiron football guard and offensive tackle who is currently a retired. He was signed by the Cleveland Browns as an undrafted free agent in 2007. He played college football at Morgan State.

Louis has also been a member of the Jacksonville Jaguars, New York Giants, Florida Tuskers, Arizona Cardinals, Detroit Lions, and Dallas Cowboys.

Clifford Louis after retiring from playing professional football obtained his Masters degree from Cleveland State University. He is also a serviceman for the US Army. Clifford currently resides in Cleveland Ohio and is a full time Fireman, Real Estate Agent with Keller Williams Greater Metropolitan and co-owner of Smoke Signals Cigar Lounge 524 E 200, Euclid Oh 44117.

Early years
Louis attended Westhill High School in Stamford, Connecticut.

College career
Louis played college football at Morgan State University in Baltimore, Maryland.

Professional career

Cleveland Browns
Louis was signed by the Cleveland Browns as an undrafted rookie free agent on May 8, 2007. He was waived on August 14, 2008.

First stint with Giants
Louis was claimed off waivers by the New York Giants on August 15, 2008. He was released on August 30 during final cuts.

Jacksonville Jaguars
On September 2, 2008, Louis was signed to the practice squad of the Jacksonville Jaguars. He was released on September 9.

Second stint with Giants
Louis was re-signed to the practice squad of the New York Giants on October 22, 2008 after the team released cornerback Rashad Barksdale. He was released on October 28, but re-signed on November 6 after defensive end Wallace Gilberry was signed by the Kansas City Chiefs.

Following the season, Louis was re-signed to a future contract on January 12, 2009. He was waived on September 5, 2009.

Florida Tuskers
Louis attended 2009 training camp with the Florida Tuskers of the United Football League. He was released on September 29.

Arizona Cardinals
Louis was signed to the Arizona Cardinals' practice squad on December 22, 2009. He was released two days later on December 24.

Edmonton Eskimos
Louis signed with the Edmonton Eskimos on April 20, 2010.

Third stint with Giants
Louis signed with the New York Giants on August 7, 2010. He was waived on August 20.

Detroit Lions
Louis signed with the Detroit Lions on August 23, 2010. He was waived on September 4, 2010.

Dallas Cowboys
Louis was signed to the Dallas Cowboys' practice squad after he was waived by Detroit. He was cut on September 17, 2010.

Cleveland Gladiators
He was picked up by the Cleveland Gladiators in 2011, and has helped them to the playoffs.

References

External links
Edmonton Eskimos bio
Cleveland Browns bio
Jacksonville Jaguars bio
New York Giants bio
Dallas Cowboys bio

1984 births
Living people
American football offensive guards
American football offensive tackles
Arizona Cardinals players
Canadian football offensive linemen
Cleveland Browns players
Cleveland Gladiators players
Dallas Cowboys players
Detroit Lions players
Edmonton Elks players
Florida Tuskers players
Hartford Colonials players
Jacksonville Jaguars players
Morgan State Bears football players
New York Giants players
Sportspeople from Brooklyn
Players of American football from New York City